Turum is an ethnic group in South Kurdufan in Sudan. They speak Tagoi, a Niger–Congo language. The population of this group is around 2,600.
The main religion is Islam.

References
Joshua Project

Nuba peoples
Ethnic groups in Sudan